Eish fino is a long baguette-shaped bread roll from Egypt made with wheat flour. It is the most commonly consumed bread type in the country after eish baladi, the staple flatbread. It has a soft texture and is often cut open to allow for fillings, common ones include various cheeses, halawa or fried cow liver. The loaves are thin and long, usually around 20 centimeters in length. The width on the other hand can vary greatly, but bakeries rarely make them wider than a few centimeters.

See also
 Egyptian cuisine

References

Arab cuisine
Egyptian breads